James Lam (born 1961) is a corporate director, management consultant, best-selling author, and keynote speaker. He is President of James Lam & Associates, a risk management consulting firm he founded in early 2002. Lam currently serves as chair of the risk oversight committee and a member of the audit committee on the board of E*TRADE Financial Corporation. He also serves as an independent director and chair of the audit committee of RiskLens, Inc.

Lam advises C-level executives and boards on enterprise risk engagements, including strategic, market, credit, operational, and cybersecurity risks. He has done significant work with boards on governance structure, risk appetite policy, and board reporting. In a research report, Forrester Research ranked James Lam & Associates as one of a few consulting firms with “extensive capabilities” in risk management across all major industries.

Early life and education 
Lam was born in Guangdong, China in 1961 and moved to the United States with his family in 1971. He grew up in Brooklyn and then went on to graduate summa cum laude with a BBA from Baruch College in 1983. He received his MBA with honors from UCLA in 1989.

Career

Risk management 
After graduating from Baruch College in 1983, Lam held positions as research analyst at Paine Webber, consultant at Kaplan Smith, vice president at Glendale Federal Bank, and senior consultant at First Manhattan Consulting Group. Between 1993 and 1995, Lam served as chief risk officer at GE Capital Markets Services, where he helped create a new capital markets business.

Lam also served as chief risk officer for Fidelity Investments from 1995 to 1998. His work at Fidelity has been profiled in best-practice case studies published in Risk Magazine, the Economist, Price Waterhouse Review and Risk and Insurance. 

Following his work at GE and Fidelity, Lam joined Oliver Wyman as a Partner in 1999. During his tenure at the firm, he founded ERisk, a NYC-based cloud and consulting company specializing in ERM and capital management. He initially served as Founder and President and later as Vice Chairman of the Board. ERisk was spun off as an independent company in 2001 and acquired by SunGard in 2005.

Other professional and academic activities 
Lam is on the Carnegie Mellon University faculty for their CRO Executive Certification Program. He has lectured at Harvard Business School as the subject of a HBS case study, and has taught graduate courses in risk management and advanced derivatives at Babson College and Hult International Business School.

Since 1987, Lam has delivered over 200 keynotes and speeches throughout the world.

The Committee of Sponsoring Organizations of the Treadway Commission (COSO) invited Lam to serve on the Advisory Council to update the COSO ERM Framework that was published in 2017. 

Lam is certified by the Software Engineering Institute of Carnegie Mellon in Cybersecurity Oversight.

At the National Association of Corporate Directors (NACD), Lam is a Board Leadership Fellow and is on the faculty for their board training and certification programs.

Publications 
Lam has over 100 articles and book chapters to his credit, encompassing a wide range of financial and risk management topics. He has been quoted in the Wall Street Journal, Harvard Business Review, American Banker, Financial Times, and CFO Magazine.  Lam's first book, Enterprise Risk Management: From Incentives to Controls, published in 2003 (second edition, 2014) by Wiley, has been ranked #1 best selling among 25,000 risk management titles on Amazon. It has been translated into Chinese, Indonesian, Japanese and Korean. His latest book, Implementing Enterprise Risk Management: From Methods to Applications, was published by Wiley in 2017.

Industry recognition and awards 
Lam is widely noted for coining the term, and subsequently being the first, “Chief Risk Officer”. He has been an early advocate of enterprise risk management as a consultant and practitioner.

In 1997, Lam was honored as the first person to be named Financial Risk Manager of the Year Award by the Global Association of Risk Professionals.

In 2004, he was appointed Senior Research Fellow at Peking University.

In a 2005 Euromoney survey, Lam was nominated by clients and peers as one of the leading risk consultants in the world.

Treasury & Risk Management Magazine named Lam one of the “100 Most Influential People in Finance” in 2005, 2006, and 2008.

In 2006, he was appointed Honorary President of the Asia Association of Risk and Crisis Management.

Lam served as a founding member of the Blue Ribbon Panel of PRIMA, and also served as co-chairman of the Education and Standards Committee.

Lam served as co-chairman and founding member of the prestigious Risk Who’s Who – a network of top risk professionals.

In the 2017 and 2018, the NACD honored Lam as one of the top 50 most influential corporate directors.

Personal life 
Lam currently resides in Wellesley, MA with his wife Pam and their three sons Brandon, Austin and Garrett.

References

External links 
 Enterprise Risk Management: From Incentives to Controls (2003)
 Financial Risk Manager of the Year Award
 James Lam & Associates
 Managing Business Risks in the Information Age

American non-fiction writers
Living people
Hult International Business School faculty
Babson College faculty
1961 births